The Model 7/32 and Model 8/32 were 32-bit minicomputers introduced by Perkin-Elmer after they acquired Interdata, Inc., in 1973. Interdata computers are primarily remembered for being the first 32-bit minicomputers under $10,000. The 8/32 was a more powerful machine than the 7/32, with the notable feature of allowing user-programmable microcode to be employed.

The Model 7/32 provided fullword data processing power and direct memory addressing up to 1 million bytes through the use of 32-bit general registers and a comprehensive instruction set.

Background
After the commercial success of the microcoded, mainframe IBM 360-series of computers, startup companies arrived on the scene to scale microcode technology to the smaller minicomputers. Among these companies were Prime Computer, Microdata, and Interdata. Interdata used microcode to define an architecture that was heavily influenced by the IBM 360 instruction set. The DOS-type real-time serial/multitasking operating system was called OS/32.

Differences between the 7/32 and 8/32
General register sets – The 7/32 has 2 sets while the 8/32 can have either 2 or 8.
I/O priority levels – The 7/32 has none but the 8/32 can have up to 3.
Writeable control store – The 7/32 does not have one and the 8/32 does.
 On average the 8/32 is 2.5x faster than the 7/32.

Usage

The 7/32 and 8/32 became the computers of choice in large scale embedded systems, such as FFT machines used in real-time seismic analysis, CAT scanners, and flight simulator systems. They were also often used as non-IBM peripherals in IBM networks, serving the role of HASP workstations and spooling systems, so called RJE (Remote Job Entry) stations. For example, the computers behind the first Space Shuttle simulator consisted of thirty-six 32-bit minis inputting and/or outputting data to networked mainframe computers (both IBM and Univac), all in real-time.

The 8/32 was used in the Lunar and Planetary Laboratory, Department of Planetary Sciences at the University of Arizona for research purposes.

The 8/32 was also employed by Mathematical Applications Group, Inc. (MAGI) to produce the vast majority of the 3D computer-generated imagery (CGI) in the 1982 film Tron. While CGI had been used during the 1970s for minor segments of film work (such as titles), Tron was the first film by a major producer that made extensive use of CGI.

Operating systems
The standard operating system for the 7/32 and 8/32 was Interdata's OS/32. 
At MIT, by 1976, Interdata (Perkin-Elmer) computers were being used by the Architecture Machine Group and Joint Computer Facility at MIT, using the FORTRAN and PL/1 programming languages. 

Unix was ported to the platform in 1977 by two groups, working independently; to the 7/32 at Wollongong University, and to the 8/32 at Bell Labs, making the 32-bit Interdata machines the first non-PDP computers to run Unix. (See V6 Unix, portability). Bell chose the 8/32 for their port because it was as different from the DEC PDP-11 as possible.

By 1979 researchers at the Architecture Machine Group created an operating system modeled on Multics called Magic 6, which featured the Multics concepts of pages, segments and dynamic linking, but had no security checks.

Acquisition
The success of the Interdata 32-bit minis in these markets made the company attractive to Perkin-Elmer Corporation, a large, Norwalk, Connecticut-based scientific instruments and optics manufacturer with a large presence in the defense and aerospace industries. Perkin-Elmer was also a primary competitor of Varian, a company marketing its own computer systems. Interdata was acquired by Perkin-Elmer in 1973, and brought under the corporate name in 1976 as the Computer Systems Division (CSD), one of several divisions in P-E's newly formed Data Systems Group (DSG). In 1985, the DSG was broken apart and the CSD was sold to Concurrent Computer Corporation, who produced an enhanced 3200-series of machines.

Simulation
SIMH, the historical computer simulator project, includes simulators for both the Interdata 32 bit (7/32 and 8/32) and their 16 bit minicomputers.

The Living Computer Museum has a 7/32 on display with attached teletype.

References

External links
Interdata 7/32 Reference Manual
Login into the Living Computer Museum, a portal into the Paul Allen collection of timesharing and interactive computers, including an operational Interdata 7/32

Minicomputers
32-bit computers